Arlington is a town in Middlesex County, Massachusetts, United States. The town is six miles (10 km) northwest of Boston, and its population was 46,308 at the 2020 census.

History 

European colonists settled the Town of Arlington in 1635 as a village within the boundaries of Cambridge, Massachusetts, under the name Menotomy, an Algonquian word considered by some to mean "swift running water", though linguistic anthropologists dispute that translation. A larger area, including land that was later to become the town of Belmont, and outwards to the shore of the Mystic River, which had previously been part of Charlestown, was incorporated on February 27, 1807, as West Cambridge, replacing Menotomy. In 1867, the town was renamed Arlington, in honor of those buried in Arlington National Cemetery; the name change took effect that April 30.

The Massachusett tribe, part of the Algonquian group of Native Americans, lived around the Mystic Lakes, the Mystic River and Alewife Brook. When the tribal chief, Nanepashemet, was killed by a rival tribe in about 1619, Nanepashemet's widow, known to history only as "Squaw Sachem of Mistick", became the acknowledged leader of the tribe. In 1639 she deeded the land of what was then Cambridge and Watertown to the colonists. She lived her last years on the west side of the Mystic Lakes near what is now Medford, Massachusetts, where she died sometime between 1650 and 1667.

A stream called Mill Brook flows through the town, which historically figured largely into Arlington's economy. In 1637, Captain George Cooke built the first mill in this area. Subsequently, seven mills were built along the stream, including the Old Schwamb Mill, which survives to this day. The Schwamb Mill has been a working mill since 1650, making it the longest working mill in the country.

Paul Revere's famous midnight ride to alert colonists took him through Menotomy, now known as Arlington. Later on that first day of the American Revolution, more blood was shed in Menotomy than in the battles of Lexington and Concord combined. Minutemen from surrounding towns converged on Menotomy to ambush the British on their retreat from Concord and Lexington. All in all, 25 colonials were killed in Menotomy (half of all Americans killed in the day's battles), as well as 40 British troops (more than half their fatalities).

The Jason Russell House, a yellow colonial, is today a museum which remembers those twelve Americans, including Russell himself, who were killed in and around this pictured dwelling on April 19, 1775. Bullet holes are visible in the interior walls to this day.

In its early years, Arlington was a thriving farming community and had its own lettuce that was quite popular.

Arlington had a large ice industry on Spy Pond from the mid-19th century until the last ice house burned down in 1930; much of its ice was sent to the Caribbean and India by "Ice King" Frederic Tudor.

Arlington's population grew by over 90 percent during the 1920s.

In 1979, the first spreadsheet software program, VisiCalc, was developed by Bob Frankston and Dan Bricklin in the attic of the Arlington apartment rented by Bob Frankston.

Arlington was the site of the accident which claimed the life of top professional cyclist Nicole Reinhart, a two-time Pan American Games winner. She was killed on September 17, 2000, when she was thrown from her bicycle during a National Calendar criterium bicycle race.

Geography and infrastructure 
Arlington covers 3,517.5 acres (14 km2), or 5.5 square miles, of which 286.2 acres (1.2 km2), or 0.4 square miles, are covered by water. There are 210.52 acres (0.9 km2) of parkland. Elevation ranges from 4 feet (1.2 m) above sea level (along Alewife Brook) to 377 feet (114.9 m) near Park Avenue and Eastern Avenue.

Arlington borders on the Mystic Lakes, Mystic River, and Alewife Brook. Within its borders are Spy Pond, the Arlington Reservoir, Mill Brook, and Hills Pond.

Neighborhoods 

 Arlington Center
 Arlington Heights, in the west
 East Arlington, east of Franklin Street
 Brattle Square
 Jason Heights
 Arlmont Village
 Morningside
 North Union
 Turkey Hill
 Little Scotland
 Poets' Corner
 Kelwyn Manor
 Quincy Heights, a neighborhood in Arlington Heights

Zip Codes
 02474: East Arlington, and most of the rest of the town north of the Minuteman Bikeway
 02476: Arlington Heights, and most of the rest of the town south of the Bikeway and west of Spy Pond

Adjacent municipalities
Arlington is located in eastern Massachusetts and is bordered by the cities of Medford to the northeast, Somerville to the east, Cambridge to the southeast, and the towns of Winchester to the north, Lexington to the west, and Belmont to the south.

Transportation
Several MBTA bus routes passes through the town.

Demographics 

At the 2010 census, there were 42,844 people, 18,969 households and 10,981 families residing in the town. The racial makeup of the town was 83.6% White, 2.3% African American, 0.1% Native American, 8.3% Asian, 0.4% from other races, and 2.1% from two or more races. Hispanic or Latino of any race were 3.3% of the population.

There were 19,007 households, of which 27.0% had children under the age of 18 living with them, 45.1% were married couples living together, 2.0% had a male householder with no wife present, 9.9% had a female householder with no husband present, and 43.0% were non-families. 35.1% of all households were made up of individuals, and 11.2% had someone living alone who was 65 years of age or older. The average household size was 2.23 and the average family size was 2.93.

Of the 42,844 people in the population, 21.4% were under the age of 18, 5.8% were 15 to 19 years of age, 5.3% were 20 to 24 years of age, 30.3% were 25 to 44 years of age, 28.7% were 45 to 64 years of age, and 15.8% were 65 years and over. The median age was 41.7 years. For every 100 females, there were 86.8 males. For every 100 females 18 years and over there were 83.9 males.
 
The median household income was $85,059, and the median family income was $107,862. The median income of individuals working full-time was $78,820 for males versus $64,143 for females. The per capita income for the town was $47,571. About 1.9% of families and 4.4% of the population were below the poverty line, including 2.3% of those under age 18 and 7.5% of those age 65 or over.

Income 

Data is from the 2009–2013 American Community Survey 5-Year Estimates.

Government 

Arlington's executive branch consists of an elected five-member Select Board. The day-to-day operations are handled by a Town Manager hired by the Select Board.
The legislative branch is a Representative Town Meeting, presided over by the Town Moderator, and is made up of 252 Town Meeting Members. Twelve Town Meeting Members are elected to staggered three year terms from each of the 21 precincts. Article LXXXIX Section 8 of the Massachusetts Constitution permits towns with a population greater than 12,000 to adopt a city form of government. The Town of Arlington meets the population requirement to become a city, but has not done so, in part because it would lose its ability to engage citizens in local government under the Representative Town Meeting form of government. Annual Town Meetings begin in April on the first Monday after Patriots' Day, and are held two nights a week until all items on the town warrant are resolved, and generally last three to four weeks.

In April 2021, Arlington voted to become the third municipality in the United States to recognize polyamorous domestic partnerships, following adjacent cities of Somerville and Cambridge.

Education

Public schools 

Arlington has a public school system with ten schools. (7 elementary schools, 2 middle schools, and 1 high school) The seven elementary schools (K–5) are Brackett, Bishop, Dallin, Hardy, Peirce, Stratton, and Thompson. There are also two middle schools, grade 6 at Gibbs, and grades 7–8 at Ottoson, and Arlington High School, which includes grades 9–12. In addition, Arlington is in the district served by the Minuteman Regional High School, located in Lexington, one of the top vocational-technical schools in Massachusetts.

Private and parochial schools 

There are two Parochial schools, Arlington Catholic High School, and an elementary/middle school, St. Agnes School, both affiliated with St. Agnes Parish. In addition, there are two secular elementary schools, Lesley Ellis and the Alivia Elementary School.

Supplementary schools 

The , a supplementary school for Japanese people, has its weekday office in Arlington, while it holds classes at Medford High School in Medford.

Parks and historical sites 

 The Old Schwamb Mill is the oldest continuously-operating mill site in the United States. Founded by the Schwambs, who immigrated to the U.S. from Germany, the mill currently produces and sells museum-quality, hand-turned wooden oval and circular frames, created much as they were in 1864. Named to the National Register of Historic Places in 1971, the mill-museum is operated by a nonprofit educational trust that maintains the mill's traditions.
 Menotomy Rocks Park encompasses Hills Pond and has trails through the surrounding forested land.
 Robbins Farm Park along Eastern Avenue includes a playground, ball fields, a basketball court and a commanding view of the Boston skyline.
 Robbins Library contains the oldest continuously operated free children's library in the country.
 Spy Pond Park provides access to the northeast shore of Spy Pond.
 The Arlington Center Historic District, where the Robbins Library and Old Burying Ground are located, is on the National Register of Historic Places.
 The Cyrus E. Dallin Art Museum is a site dedicated to the artwork and sculpture of noted artist Cyrus E. Dallin.
 The Great Meadow comprises both wet meadow swamp and forest right outside the border of Arlington. While the Great Meadow lies within the borders of Lexington, the park is owned and maintained by the Town of Arlington.
 The House at 5 Willow Court
 The Henry Swan House, built in 1888, is a historic house at 418 Massachusetts Avenue. It was added to the National Register of Historic Places in 1985.
 The Jason Russell House contains a museum that displays, among other items, a mastodon tusk found in Spy Pond in the late 1950s by a fisherman who originally thought he had brought up a tree branch.
 The Minuteman Bikeway, a popular rail trail built in 1992, passes through various Arlington neighborhoods, including Arlington Center.
 The Prince Hall Mystic Cemetery, the only black Freemason Cemetery in the country.
 The Uncle Sam Memorial Statue commemorates native son Samuel Wilson, who was perhaps the original Uncle Sam.
 The Water tower at Park Circle is an exact copy of the rotunda of the ancient Greek Arsinoeon of the Samothrace temple complex.

Regent Theatre
The Regent Theatre is a historic theater in downtown Arlington. It was built in 1916 for vaudeville acts and is still used for live performances as well as films. It was remodeled in 1926. The theatre, located at 7 Medford Street, has 500 seats. It hosts the Arlington International Film Festival.

Notable people 

 Sven Birkerts (born 1951), essayist and literary critic
 Paul Boudreau, former NFL offensive line coach for the St. Louis Rams
 John Quincy Adams Brackett, Former Massachusetts Governor
 William Stanley Braithwaite, writer, poet and literary critic. Won Spingarn Medal in 1918
 Christopher Castellani, writer
 Andrew Chaikin, space journalist and author of A Man on the Moon, on which HBO based a miniseries
 Haroutioun Hovanes Chakmakjian, chemistry professor, Armenian scholar, and father of Alan Hovhaness
 Pat Connaughton, Player for 2021 NBA Champion Milwaukee Bucks 
 Dane Cook, comedian & actor
 Robert Creeley (1926–2005), poet
 Cyrus E. Dallin (1861–1944), sculptor; best known for the Appeal to the Great Spirit sculpture in front of the Museum of Fine Arts, Boston
 Adio diBiccari, sculptor
 Joshua Eric Dodge, Wisconsin Supreme Court
 Olympia Dukakis (born 1931), actress, Academy Award winner
 Bob Frankston, co-inventor of Visicalc, the first electronic spreadsheet, at 231 Broadway
 Samuel Garman (1843–1927), explorer, ichthyologist, and herpetologist
 Roy J. Glauber, Nobel Prize winner (Physics), 2005
 Katy Grannan, photographer
 George Franklin Grant, first black graduate of Harvard Dental School and inventor of a type of golf tee
 Deborah Henson-Conant, Grammy-nominated harpist
 Susan Hilferty, costume designer, Wicked
 Winslow Homer, painter (location is now in Belmont)
 Alan Hovhaness (1911–2000), composer
 Timothy Hutton, Actor, youngest winner of an Academy Award for Best Supporting Actor
 Anthony James (1942–2020), actor
 John A. "Johnny" Kelley, Boston Marathon winner, 1935 and 1945, Olympian athlete
 Richard Lennon, Roman Catholic Bishop of Cleveland
 J. C. R. Licklider (1915–1990), computer scientist
 Thomas Louis "Tom" Magliozzi, co-host of NPR's weekly radio show Car Talk
 Raymond Francis "Ray" Magliozzi, co-host of NPR's weekly radio show Car Talk
 Elaine J. McCarthy projection designer for Broadway and opera
 William J. McCarthy, President of the International Brotherhood of Teamsters (IBT)
 Eugene Francis McGurl, US Army Air Forces 95th Bomb Sq., 17th Bomb Grp Navigator who flew with Crew 5 in General Jimmy Doolittle's famous "Thirty Seconds over Tokyo" raid in World War II
 Tom McNeeley, Jr., former heavyweight contender who challenged Floyd Patterson for the heavyweight title in Toronto in 1961
 John Messuri, Princeton College hockey player
 Eileen Myles, poet, novelist
 Jordan Peterson, Canadian clinical psychologist and professor of psychology at the University of Toronto. Lived in Arlington between 1993 and 1998 while teaching at Harvard University
 David Powers, former Special Assistant to US President John F. Kennedy
 Hilary Putnam (1926–2016), philosopher, mathematician and computer scientist, professor emeritus at Harvard
 Warren Winn Rawson, market gardener and seed distributor
 Herb Reed, vocalist and founding member of The Platters
Miles Robinson, current professional soccer player for Atlanta United 
Dave "Chico" Ryan, bassist of Sha Na Na
 Whitney Smith, vexillologist and designer of the flag of Guyana
 Chris Smither, blues guitarist/singer.
 Bill Squires, American Track & Field Coach
 Anthony Stacchi, scenarist (Open Season)
 Mark J. Sullivan, Director of the United States Secret Service
 John Townsend Trowbridge (1827–1916), writer
 Samuel Whittemore, elderly soldier in the Battle of Lexington and Concord
 Alan Wilson (1943–1970), also known as Alan "Blind Owl" Wilson; singer, songwriter, leader of Canned Heat
 Samuel Wilson (1766–1854), meat-packer, namesake of "Uncle Sam" 
 Brianna Wu, video game developer, primary victim of Gamergate controversy, congressional candidate
 Tom Yewcic, former quarterback with the Boston Patriots from 1961 to 1966, and former catcher for the Detroit Tigers; only person ever to play two professional sports at Fenway Park

In popular culture 
 Two feature films have been shot partially in Arlington: The Out-of-Towners, starring Steve Martin and Goldie Hawn, and Once Around, starring Richard Dreyfuss and Holly Hunter.
 Three widely recognized television shows have been filmed in Arlington: This Old House, Trading Spaces, and Made.
 A History Channel special, Bible Battles, was filmed in Arlington.
 Arlington is referenced in the movie The Verdict starring Paul Newman. South Boston's K Street takes the place of Arlington in the movie.
 The music video for "Sing" by The Dresden Dolls was shot at the Regent Theatre in Arlington Center.
 The Steve Katsos Show is filmed at ACMi Studios in Arlington Heights.
 Arlington's Little League baseball team won the Massachusetts State Little League championship in 1971.

Sister cities 

 Teosinte, El Salvador
 Nagaokakyo, Kyoto, Japan

See also 

 List of Registered Historic Places in Arlington, Massachusetts

References

Further reading 
 Somerville, Arlington and Belmont Directory. 1869; 1873; 1876.

External links 

  Official town web site
  Visit Town of Arlington MA website
 
 Arlington on the NPR program Weekend America, December 22, 2007

 
1635 establishments in Massachusetts
Towns in Massachusetts
Towns in Middlesex County, Massachusetts
Populated places established in 1635